The American Revolutionary War (April 19, 1775 – September 3, 1783), also known as the Revolutionary War or American War of Independence, was the military conflict of the American Revolution in which American Patriot forces under George Washington's command defeated the British, establishing and securing the independence of the United States. Fighting began on April 19, 1775, at the Battles of Lexington and Concord. The war was formalized and intensified following passage of the Lee Resolution on July 2, 1776, which asserted that the Thirteen Colonies were "free and independent states", and the Declaration of Independence, drafted by the Committee of Five and written primarily by Thomas Jefferson, two days later, on July 4, 1776, by the Second Continental Congress in Philadelphia.

In the war, American patriot forces were supported by the Kingdom of France and the Kingdom of Spain. The British were supported by Hessian soldiers from present-day Germany, most Native Americans, Loyalists, and freedmen. The conflict was fought in North America, the Caribbean, and the Atlantic Ocean.

Established by Royal charter in the 17th and 18th centuries, the American colonies were largely autonomous in domestic affairs and commercially prosperous, trading with Britain and its Caribbean colonies, as well as other European powers via their Caribbean entrepôts. After British victory over the French in the Seven Years' War in 1763, tensions between Britain and the thirteen American colonies arose over trade, policy in the Northwest Territory, and taxation measures, including the Stamp Act and Townshend Acts. Colonial opposition led to the Boston Massacre in 1770, which strengthened the desire for independence from Britain. While the earlier taxation measures were repealed, Parliament adopted the Tea Act in 1773, a measure that led to the Boston Tea Party on December 16. In response, Parliament imposed the Intolerable Acts in mid-1774, closing Boston Harbor and revoking Massachusetts' charter, thus placing the colony under the direct control of the British government.

These measures stirred unrest throughout the colonies, 12 of which sent delegates to Philadelphia in early September 1774 to organize a protest as the First Continental Congress. In an appeal to Britain's George III seeking peace, the Congress drafted a Petition to the King but also threatened a boycott of British goods known as the Continental Association if the Intolerable Acts were not withdrawn. Despite attempts to achieve a peaceful solution, fighting began, after the Westminster Massacre in March, with the Battle of Lexington on April 19, 1775, and in June Congress authorized the creation of a Continental Army with George Washington as commander-in-chief. Although the coercion policy advocated by the North ministry was opposed by a faction within Parliament, both sides increasingly viewed conflict as inevitable. The Olive Branch Petition sent by Congress to George III in July 1775 was rejected, and in August Parliament declared the colonies in a state of rebellion.

Following the loss of Boston in March 1776, Sir William Howe, the new British commander-in-chief, launched the New York and New Jersey campaign. He captured New York City in November, before Washington won small but significant victories at Trenton and Princeton, which restored Patriot confidence. In summer 1777, Howe succeeded in taking Philadelphia, but in October a separate force under John Burgoyne was forced to surrender at Saratoga. This victory was crucial in convincing powers like France and Spain that an independent United States was a viable entity. The Continental Army then went into winter quarters in Valley Forge, where General von Steuben drilled it into an organized fighting unit.

France provided the U.S. with informal economic and military support from the beginning of the rebellion, and after Saratoga the two countries signed a commercial agreement and a Treaty of Alliance in February 1778. In return for a guarantee of independence, Congress joined France in its global war with Britain and agreed to defend the French West Indies. Spain also allied with France against Britain in the Treaty of Aranjuez (1779), though it did not formally ally with the Americans. Nevertheless, access to ports in Spanish Louisiana allowed the Patriots to import arms and supplies, while the Spanish Gulf Coast campaign deprived the Royal Navy of key bases in the south.

This undermined the 1778 strategy devised by Howe's replacement, Sir Henry Clinton, which took the war into the Southern United States. Despite some initial success, by September 1781 Cornwallis was besieged by a Franco-American force in Yorktown. After an attempt to resupply the garrison failed, Cornwallis surrendered in October. Although the British wars with France and Spain continued for another two years, Britain's forces in America were generally confined to several harbors and western forts, while fighting in North America largely ceased. In April 1782, the North ministry was replaced by a new British government which accepted American independence and began negotiating the Treaty of Paris. With the treaty's ratification on September 3, 1783, Britain accepted American independence, and the war officially ended. The Treaties of Versailles resolved Britain's conflicts with France and Spain.

Prelude to revolution 

The French and Indian War, part of the wider global conflict known as the Seven Years' War, ended with the 1763 Peace of Paris, which expelled France from its possessions in New France. Acquisition of territories in Atlantic Canada and West Florida, inhabited largely by French or Spanish-speaking Catholics, led the British authorities to consolidate their hold by populating them with English-speaking settlers. Preventing conflict between settlers and Native American tribes west of the Appalachian Mountains would also avoid the cost of an expensive military occupation.

The Proclamation Line of 1763 was designed to achieve these aims by refocusing colonial expansion north into Nova Scotia and south into Florida, with the Mississippi River as the dividing line between British and Spanish possessions in the Americas. Settlement beyond the 1763 limits was tightly restricted, while claims by individual colonies west of this line were rescinded, most significantly Virginia and Massachusetts who argued their boundaries extended from the Atlantic to the Pacific.

Ultimately the vast exchange of territory destabilized existing alliances and trade networks between settlers and Native Americans in the west, while it proved impossible to prevent encroachment beyond the Proclamation Line. With the exception of Virginia and others "deprived" of their rights in the western lands, the colonial legislatures generally agreed on the principle of boundaries but disagreed on where to set them, while many settlers resented the restrictions. Since enforcement required permanent garrisons along the frontier, it led to increasingly bitter disputes over who should pay for them.

Taxation and legislation

Although directly administered by the Crown, acting through a local governor, the colonies were largely governed by native-born property owners. While external affairs were managed by London, colonial militia were funded locally but with the ending of the French threat in 1763, the legislatures expected less taxation, not more. At the same time, the huge debt incurred by the Seven Years' War and demands from British taxpayers for cuts in government expenditure meant Parliament expected the colonies to fund their own defense.

The 1763 to 1765 Grenville ministry instructed the Royal Navy to stop the trade of smuggled goods and enforce customs duties levied in American ports. The most important was the 1733 Molasses Act; routinely ignored prior to 1763, it had a significant economic impact since 85% of New England rum exports were manufactured from imported molasses. These measures were followed by the Sugar Act and Stamp Act, which imposed additional taxes on the colonies to pay for defending the western frontier. In July 1765, the Whigs formed the First Rockingham ministry, which repealed the Stamp Act and reduced tax on foreign molasses to help the New England economy, but re-asserted Parliamentary authority in the Declaratory Act.

However, this did little to end the discontent; in 1768, a riot started in Boston when the authorities seized the sloop Liberty on suspicion of smuggling. Tensions escalated further in March 1770 when British troops fired on rock-throwing civilians, killing five in what became known as the Boston Massacre. The Massacre coincided with the partial repeal of the Townshend Acts by the Tory-based North Ministry, which came to power in January 1770 and remained in office until 1781. North insisted on retaining duty on tea to enshrine Parliament's right to tax the colonies; the amount was minor, but ignored the fact it was that very principle Americans found objectionable.

Tensions escalated following the destruction of a customs vessel in the June 1772 Gaspee Affair, then came to a head in 1773. A banking crisis led to the near-collapse of the East India Company, which dominated the British economy; to support it, Parliament passed the Tea Act, giving it a trading monopoly in the Thirteen Colonies. Since most American tea was smuggled by the Dutch, the Act was opposed by those who managed the illegal trade, while being seen as yet another attempt to impose the principle of taxation by Parliament. In December 1773, a group called the Sons of Liberty disguised as Mohawk natives dumped 342 crates of tea into Boston Harbor, an event later known as the Boston Tea Party. Parliament responded by passing the so-called Intolerable Acts, aimed specifically at Massachusetts, although many colonists and members of the Whig opposition considered them a threat to liberty in general. This led to increased sympathy for the Patriot cause locally, as well as in Parliament and the London press.

Break with the British Crown
Over the course of the 18th century, the elected lower houses in the colonial legislatures gradually wrested power from their royal governors. Dominated by smaller landowners and merchants, these assemblies now established ad-hoc provincial legislatures, variously called congresses, conventions, and conferences, effectively replacing royal control. With the exception of Georgia, twelve colonies sent representatives to the First Continental Congress to agree on a unified response to the crisis. Many of the delegates feared that an all-out boycott would result in war and sent a Petition to the King calling for the repeal of the Intolerable Acts. However, after some debate, on September 17, 1774, Congress endorsed the Massachusetts Suffolk Resolves and on October 20 passed the Continental Association; based on a draft prepared by the First Virginia Convention in August, this instituted economic sanctions against Britain.

While denying its authority over internal American affairs, a faction led by James Duane and future Loyalist Joseph Galloway insisted Congress recognize Parliament's right to regulate colonial trade. Expecting concessions by the North administration, Congress authorized the extralegal committees and conventions of the colonial legislatures to enforce the boycott; this succeeded in reducing British imports by 97% from 1774 to 1775. However, on February 9 Parliament declared Massachusetts to be in a state of rebellion and instituted a blockade of the colony. In July, the Restraining Acts limited colonial trade with the British West Indies and Britain and barred New England ships from the Newfoundland cod fisheries. The increase in tension led to a scramble for control of militia stores, which each Assembly was legally obliged to maintain for defense. On April 19, a British attempt to secure the Concord arsenal culminated in the Battles of Lexington and Concord which began the war.

Political reactions

After the Patriot victory at Concord, moderates in Congress led by John Dickinson drafted the Olive Branch Petition, offering to accept royal authority in return for George III mediating in the dispute. However, since the petition was immediately followed by the Declaration of the Causes and Necessity of Taking Up Arms, Colonial Secretary Lord Dartmouth viewed the offer as insincere; he refused to present the petition to the king, which was therefore rejected in early September. Although constitutionally correct, since George could not oppose his own government, it disappointed those Americans who hoped he would mediate in the dispute, while the hostility of his language annoyed even Loyalist members of Congress. Combined with the Proclamation of Rebellion, issued on August 23 in response to the Battle at Bunker Hill, it ended hopes of a peaceful settlement.

Backed by the Whigs, Parliament initially rejected the imposition of coercive measures by 170 votes, fearing an aggressive policy would simply drive the Americans towards independence. However, by the end of 1774 the collapse of British authority meant both Lord North and George III were convinced war was inevitable. After Boston, Gage halted operations and awaited reinforcements; the Irish Parliament approved the recruitment of new regiments, while allowing Catholics to enlist for the first time. Britain also signed a series of treaties with German states to supply additional troops. Within a year it had an army of over 32,000 men in America, the largest ever sent outside Europe at the time.

The employment of German soldiers against people viewed as British citizens was opposed by many in Parliament, as well as the colonial assemblies; combined with the lack of activity by Gage, opposition to the use of foreign troops allowed the Patriots to take control of the legislatures. Support for independence was boosted by Thomas Paine's pamphlet Common Sense, which argued for American self-government and was widely reprinted. To draft the Declaration of Independence, Congress appointed the Committee of Five, consisting of Thomas Jefferson, John Adams, Benjamin Franklin, Roger Sherman and Robert Livingston. Identifying inhabitants of the Thirteen Colonies as "one people", it simultaneously dissolved political links with Britain, while including a long list of alleged violations of "English rights" committed by George III.

On July 2, Congress voted for independence and published the declaration on July 4, which Washington read to his troops in New York City on July 9. At this point, the Revolution ceased to be an internal dispute over trade and tax policies and became a civil war, since each state represented in Congress was engaged in a struggle with Britain, but also split between Patriots and Loyalists. Patriots generally supported independence from Britain and a new national union in Congress, while Loyalists remained faithful to British rule. Estimates of numbers vary, one suggestion being the population as a whole was split evenly between committed Patriots, committed Loyalists and those who were indifferent. Others calculate the split as 40% Patriot, 40% neutral, 20% Loyalist, but with considerable regional variations.

At the onset of the war, Congress realized defeating Britain required foreign alliances and intelligence-gathering. The Committee of Secret Correspondence was formed for "the sole purpose of corresponding with our friends in Great Britain and other parts of the world". From 1775 to 1776, the committee shared information and built alliances through secret correspondence, as well as employing secret agents in Europe to gather intelligence, conduct undercover operations, analyze foreign publications and initiate Patriot propaganda campaigns. Paine served as secretary, while Benjamin Franklin and Silas Deane, sent to France to recruit military engineers, were instrumental in securing French aid in Paris.

War breaks out
The war consisted of two principal campaign theaters within the thirteen states, and a smaller but strategically important one in the west of the Appalachian Mountains. Fighting began in the Northern Theater and was at its most severe from 1775 to 1778. The Patriots achieved several strategic victories in the South and after defeating a British army at Saratoga in October 1777, the French formally entered the war as an American ally.

During 1778, Washington prevented the British army breaking out of New York City, while militia under George Rogers Clark supported by Francophone settlers and their Indian allies conquered Western Quebec, which became the Northwest Territory. With the war in the north stalemated, in 1779 the British initiated their southern strategy, which aimed to mobilise Loyalist support in the region and reoccupy Patriot-controlled territory north to Chesapeake Bay. The campaign was initially successful, with the British capture of Charleston being a major setback for southern Patriots; however, a Franco-American force surrounded a British army at Yorktown and their surrender in October 1781 effectively ended fighting in North America.

Early engagements

On April 14, 1775, Sir Thomas Gage, Commander-in-Chief, North America since 1763 and also Governor of Massachusetts from 1774, received orders to take action against the Patriots. He decided to destroy militia ordnance stored at Concord, Massachusetts, and capture John Hancock and Samuel Adams, who were considered the principal instigators of the rebellion. The operation was to begin around midnight on April 19, in the hope of completing it before the Patriots could respond. However, Paul Revere learned of the plan and notified Captain Parker, commander of the Concord militia, who prepared to resist the attempted seizure. The first action of the war, commonly referred to as the shot heard round the world, was a brief skirmish at Lexington, followed by the full-scale Battles of Lexington and Concord. British troops suffered around 300 casualties before withdrawing to Boston, which was then besieged by the militia.

In May, 4,500 British reinforcements arrived under Generals William Howe, John Burgoyne, and Sir Henry Clinton. On June 17, they seized the Charlestown Peninsula at the Battle of Bunker Hill, a frontal assault in which they suffered over 1,000 casualties. Dismayed at the costly attack which had gained them little, Gage appealed to London for a larger army to suppress the revolt, but instead was replaced as commander by Howe.

On June 14, 1775, Congress took control of Patriot forces outside Boston, and Congressional leader John Adams nominated George Washington as commander-in-chief of the new Continental Army. Washington previously commanded Virginia militia regiments in the French and Indian War, and on June 16, John Hancock officially proclaimed him "General and Commander in Chief of the army of the United Colonies." He assumed command on July 3, preferring to fortify Dorchester Heights outside Boston rather than assaulting it. In early March 1776, Colonel Henry Knox arrived with heavy artillery acquired in the Capture of Fort Ticonderoga. Under cover of darkness, on March 5, Washington placed these on Dorchester Heights, from where they could fire on the town and British ships in Boston Harbor. Fearing another Bunker Hill, Howe evacuated the city on March 17 without further loss and sailed to Halifax, Nova Scotia, while Washington moved south to New York City.

Beginning in August 1775, American privateers raided towns in Nova Scotia, including Saint John, Charlottetown, and Yarmouth. In 1776, John Paul Jones and Jonathan Eddy attacked Canso and Fort Cumberland respectively. British officials in Quebec began negotiating with the Iroquois for their support, while US envoys urged them to remain neutral. Aware of Native American leanings toward the British and fearing an Anglo-Indian attack from Canada, Congress authorized a second invasion in April 1775. After defeat at the Battle of Quebec on December 31, the Americans maintained a loose blockade of the city until they retreated on May 6, 1776. A second defeat at Trois-Rivières on June 8 ended operations in Quebec.

British pursuit was initially blocked by American naval vessels on Lake Champlain until victory at Valcour Island on October 11 forced the Americans to withdraw to Fort Ticonderoga, while in December an uprising in Nova Scotia sponsored by Massachusetts was defeated at Fort Cumberland. These failures impacted public support for the Patriot cause, and aggressive anti-Loyalist policies in the New England colonies alienated the Canadians.

In Virginia, an attempt by Governor Lord Dunmore to seize militia stores on April 20, 1775, led to an increase in tension, although conflict was avoided for the time being. This changed after the publication of Dunmore's Proclamation on November 7, 1775, promising freedom to any slaves who fled their Patriot masters and agreed to fight for the Crown. British forces were defeated at Great Bridge on December 9 and took refuge on British ships anchored near the port of Norfolk. When the Third Virginia Convention refused to disband its militia or accept martial law, Dunmore ordered the Burning of Norfolk on January 1, 1776.

The siege of Savage's Old Fields began on November 19 in South Carolina between Loyalist and Patriot militias, and the Loyalists were subsequently driven out of the colony in the Snow Campaign. Loyalists were recruited in North Carolina to reassert British rule in the South, but they were decisively defeated in the Battle of Moore's Creek Bridge. A British expedition sent to reconquer South Carolina launched an attack on Charleston in the Battle of Sullivan's Island on June 28, 1776, but it failed and left the South under Patriot control until 1780.

A shortage of gunpowder led Congress to authorize a naval expedition against The Bahamas to secure ordnance stored there. On March 3, 1776, an American squadron under the command of Esek Hopkins landed at the east end of Nassau and encountered minimal resistance at Fort Montagu. Hopkins' troops then marched on Fort Nassau. Hopkins had promised governor Montfort Browne and the civilian inhabitants of the area that their lives and property would not be in any danger if they offered no resistance, to which they complied. Hopkins captured large stores of powder and other munitions that was so great he had to impress an extra ship in the harbor to transport the supplies back home, when he departed on March 17.

British New York counter-offensive

After regrouping at Halifax, Nova Scotia, William Howe was determined to take the fight to the Americans. He sailed for New York in June 1776 and began landing troops on Staten Island near the entrance to New York Harbor on July 2. The Americans rejected Howe's informal attempt to negotiate peace on July 30; Washington knew that an attack on the city was imminent and realized that he needed advance information to deal with disciplined British regular troops. On August 12, 1776, Patriot Thomas Knowlton was given orders to form an elite group for reconnaissance and secret missions. Knowlton's Rangers, which included Nathan Hale, became the Army's first intelligence unit. When Washington was driven off Long Island he soon realized that he would need more than military might and amateur spies to defeat the British. He was committed to professionalizing military intelligence, and with the aid of Benjamin Tallmadge, they launched the six-man Culper spy ring. The efforts of Washington and the Culper Spy Ring substantially increased effective allocation and deployment of Continental regiments in the field. Over the course of the war Washington spent more than 10 percent of his total military funds on intelligence operations.

Washington split his army into positions on Manhattan Island and across the East River in western Long Island. On August 27 at the Battle of Long Island, Howe outflanked Washington and forced him back to Brooklyn Heights, but he did not attempt to encircle Washington's forces. Through the night of August 28, General Henry Knox bombarded the British. Knowing they were up against overwhelming odds, Washington ordered the assembly of a war council on August 29; all agreed to retreat to Manhattan. Washington quickly had his troops assembled and ferried them across the East River to Manhattan on flat-bottomed freight boats without any losses in men or ordnance, leaving General Thomas Mifflin's regiments as a rearguard.

General Howe officially met with a delegation from Congress at the September Staten Island Peace Conference, but it failed to conclude peace as the British delegates only had the authority to offer pardons and could not recognize independence. On September 15, Howe seized control of New York City when the British landed at Kip's Bay and unsuccessfully engaged the Americans at the Battle of Harlem Heights the following day. On October 18, Howe failed to encircle the Americans at the Battle of Pell's Point, and the Americans withdrew. Howe declined to close with Washington's army on October 28 at the Battle of White Plains, and instead attacked a hill that was of no strategic value.

Washington's retreat isolated his remaining forces and the British captured Fort Washington on November 16. The British victory there amounted to Washington's most disastrous defeat with the loss of 3,000 prisoners. The remaining American regiments on Long Island fell back four days later. General Henry Clinton wanted to pursue Washington's disorganized army, but he was first required to commit 6,000 troops to capture Newport, Rhode Island to secure the Loyalist port. General Charles Cornwallis pursued Washington, but Howe ordered him to halt, leaving Washington unmolested.

The outlook was bleak for the American cause: the reduced army had dwindled to fewer than 5,000 men and would be reduced further when enlistments expired at the end of the year. Popular support wavered, morale declined, and Congress abandoned Philadelphia and moved to Baltimore. Loyalist activity surged in the wake of the American defeat, especially in New York state.

In London, news of the victorious Long Island campaign was well received with festivities held in the capital. Public support reached a peak, and King George III awarded the Order of the Bath to Howe. Strategic deficiencies among Patriot forces were evident: Washington divided a numerically weaker army in the face of a stronger one, his inexperienced staff misread the military situation, and American troops fled in the face of enemy fire. The successes led to predictions that the British could win within a year. In the meantime, the British established winter quarters in the New York City area and anticipated renewed campaigning the following spring.

Patriot resurgence

Two weeks after Congress withdrew to Maryland, on the night of December 25–26, 1776, Washington crossed the Delaware River, leading a column of Continental Army troops from today's Bucks County, Pennsylvania, located about 30 miles upriver from Philadelphia, to today's Mercer County, New Jersey, in a logistically challenging and dangerous operation.

Meanwhile, the Hessians were involved with numerous clashes with small bands of patriots and were often aroused by false alarms at night in the weeks before the actual Battle of Trenton. By Christmas they were tired and weary, while a heavy snow storm led their commander, Colonel Johann Rall, to assume no attack of any consequence would occur. At daybreak on the 26th, the American patriots surprised and overwhelmed Rall and his troops, who lost over 20 killed including Rall, while 900 prisoners, German cannons and much supply were captured.

The Battle of Trenton restored the American army's morale, reinvigorated the Patriot cause, and dispelled their fear of the what they regarded as Hessian "mercenaries". A British attempt to retake Trenton was repulsed at Assunpink Creek on January 2; during the night, Washington outmaneuvered Cornwallis, then defeated his rearguard in the Battle of Princeton the following day. The two victories helped convince the French that the Americans were worthy military allies.

After his success at Princeton, Washington entered winter quarters at Morristown, New Jersey, where he remained until May and received Congressional direction to inoculate all patriot troops against smallpox.  With the exception of a minor skirmishing between the two armies which continued until March, Howe made no attempt to attack the Americans.

British northern strategy fails

The 1776 campaign demonstrated regaining New England would be a prolonged affair, which led to a change in British strategy. This involved isolating the north from the rest of the country by taking control of the Hudson River, allowing them to focus on the south where Loyalist support was believed to be substantial. In December 1776, Howe wrote to the Colonial Secretary Lord Germain, proposing a limited offensive against Philadelphia, while a second force moved down the Hudson from Canada. Germain received this on February 23, 1777, followed a few days later by a memorandum from Burgoyne, then in London on leave.

Burgoyne supplied several alternatives, all of which gave him responsibility for the offensive, with Howe remaining on the defensive. The option selected required him to lead the main force south from Montreal down the Hudson Valley, while a detachment under Barry St. Leger moved east from Lake Ontario. The two would meet at Albany, leaving Howe to decide whether to join them. Reasonable in principle, this did not account for the logistical difficulties involved and Burgoyne erroneously assumed Howe would remain on the defensive; Germain's failure to make this clear meant he opted to attack Philadelphia instead.

Burgoyne set out on June 14, 1777, with a mixed force of British regulars, professional German soldiers and Canadian militia, and captured Fort Ticonderoga on July 5. As General Horatio Gates retreated, his troops blocked roads, destroyed bridges, dammed streams, and stripped the area of food. This slowed Burgoyne's progress and forced him to send out large foraging expeditions; on one of these, more than 700 British troops were captured at the Battle of Bennington on August 16. St Leger moved east and besieged Fort Stanwix; despite defeating an American relief force at the Battle of Oriskany on August 6, he was abandoned by his Indian allies and withdrew to Quebec on August 22. Now isolated and outnumbered by Gates, Burgoyne continued onto Albany rather than retreating to Fort Ticonderoga, reaching Saratoga on September 13. He asked Clinton for support while constructing defenses around the town.

Morale among his troops rapidly declined, and an unsuccessful attempt to break past Gates at the Battle of Freeman Farms on September 19 resulted in 600 British casualties. When Clinton advised he could not reach them, Burgoyne's subordinates advised retreat; a reconnaissance in force on October 7 was repulsed by Gates at the Battle of Bemis Heights, forcing them back into Saratoga with heavy losses. By October 11, all hope of escape had vanished; persistent rain reduced the camp to a "squalid hell" of mud and starving cattle, supplies were dangerously low and many of the wounded in agony. Burgoyne capitulated on October 17; around 6,222 soldiers, including German forces commanded by General Friedrich Adolf Riedesel, surrendered their arms before being taken to Boston, where they were to be transported to England.

After securing additional supplies, Howe made another attempt on Philadelphia by landing his troops in Chesapeake Bay on August 24. He now compounded failure to support Burgoyne by missing repeated opportunities to destroy his opponent, defeating Washington at the Battle of Brandywine on September 11, then allowing him to withdraw in good order. After dispersing an American detachment at Paoli on September 20, Cornwallis occupied Philadelphia on September 26, with the main force of 9,000 under Howe based just to the north at Germantown. Washington attacked them on October 4, but was repulsed.

To prevent Howe's forces in Philadelphia being resupplied by sea, the Patriots erected Fort Mifflin and nearby Fort Mercer on the east and west banks of the Delaware respectively, and placed obstacles in the river south of the city. This was supported by a small flotilla of Continental Navy ships on the Delaware, supplemented by the Pennsylvania State Navy, commanded by John Hazelwood. An attempt by the Royal Navy to take the forts in the October 20 to 22 Battle of Red Bank failed; a second attack captured Fort Mifflin on November 16, while Fort Mercer was abandoned two days later when Cornwallis breached the walls. His supply lines secured, Howe tried to tempt Washington into giving battle, but after inconclusive skirmishing at the Battle of White Marsh from December 5 to 8, he withdrew to Philadelphia for the winter.

On December 19, the Americans followed suit and entered winter quarters at Valley Forge; while Washington's domestic opponents contrasted his lack of battlefield success with Gates' victory at Saratoga, foreign observers such as Frederick the Great were equally impressed with Germantown, which demonstrated resilience and determination. Over the winter, poor conditions, supply problems and low morale resulted in 2,000 deaths, with another 3,000 unfit for duty due to lack of shoes. However, Baron Friedrich Wilhelm von Steuben took the opportunity to introduce Prussian Army drill and infantry tactics to the entire Continental Army; he did this by training "model companies" in each regiment, who then instructed their home units. Despite Valley Forge being only twenty miles away, Howe made no effort to attack their camp, an action some critics argue could have ended the war.

Foreign intervention

Like his predecessors, French foreign minister Vergennes considered the 1763 Peace a national humiliation and viewed the war as an opportunity to weaken Britain. He initially avoided open conflict, but allowed American ships to take on cargoes in French ports, a technical violation of neutrality. Although public opinion favored the American cause, Finance Minister Turgot argued they did not need French help to gain independence, and war was too expensive. Instead, Vergennes persuaded Louis XVI to secretly fund a government front company to purchase munitions for the Patriots, carried in neutral Dutch ships and imported through Sint Eustatius in the Caribbean.

Many Americans opposed a French alliance, fearing to "exchange one tyranny for another", but this changed after a series of military setbacks in early 1776. As France had nothing to gain from the colonies reconciling with Britain, Congress had three choices; making peace on British terms, continuing the struggle on their own, or proclaiming independence, guaranteed by France. Although the Declaration of Independence in July 1776 had wide public support, Adams was among those reluctant to pay the price of an alliance with France, and over 20% of Congressmen voted against it. Congress agreed to the treaty with reluctance and as the war moved in their favor increasingly lost interest in it.

Silas Deane was sent to Paris to begin negotiations with Vergennes, whose key objectives were replacing Britain as the United States' primary commercial and military partner while securing the French West Indies from American expansion. These islands were extremely valuable; in 1772, the value of sugar and coffee produced by Saint-Domingue on its own exceeded that of all American exports combined. Talks progressed slowly until October 1777, when British defeat at Saratoga and their apparent willingness to negotiate peace convinced Vergennes only a permanent alliance could prevent the "disaster" of Anglo-American rapprochement. Assurances of formal French support allowed Congress to reject the Carlisle Peace Commission and insist on nothing short of complete independence.

On February 6, 1778, France and the United States signed the Treaty of Amity and Commerce regulating trade between the two countries, followed by a defensive military alliance against Britain, the Treaty of Alliance. In return for French guarantees of American independence, Congress undertook to defend their interests in the West Indies, while both sides agreed not to make a separate peace; conflict over these provisions would lead to the 1798 to 1800 Quasi-War. Charles III of Spain was invited to join on the same terms but refused, largely due to concerns over the impact of the Revolution on Spanish colonies in the Americas. Spain had complained on multiple occasions about encroachment by American settlers into Louisiana, a problem that could only get worse once the United States replaced Britain.

Although Spain ultimately made important contributions to American success, in the Treaty of Aranjuez (1779), Charles agreed only to support France's war with Britain outside America, in return for help in recovering Gibraltar, Menorca and Spanish Florida. The terms were confidential since several conflicted with American aims; for example, the French claimed exclusive control of the Newfoundland cod fisheries, a non-negotiable for colonies like Massachusetts. One less well-known impact of this agreement was the abiding American distrust of 'foreign entanglements'; the US would not sign another treaty with France until their NATO agreement of 1949. This was because the US had agreed not to make peace without France, while Aranjuez committed France to keep fighting until Spain recovered Gibraltar, effectively making it a condition of US independence without the knowledge of Congress.

To encourage French participation in the struggle for independence, the US representative in Paris, Silas Deane promised promotion and command positions to any French officer who joined the Continental Army. Such as Gilbert du Motier, Marquis de Lafayette, whom Congress via Dean appointed a major General, on July 31, 1777.

When the war started, Britain tried to borrow the Dutch-based Scots Brigade for service in America, but pro-Patriot sentiment led the States General to refuse. Although the Republic was no longer a major power, prior to 1774 they still dominated the European carrying trade, and Dutch merchants made large profits shipping French-supplied munitions to the Patriots. This ended when Britain declared war in December 1780, a conflict that proved disastrous to the Dutch economy. The Dutch were also excluded from the First League of Armed Neutrality, formed by Russia, Sweden and Denmark in March 1780 to protect neutral shipping from being stopped and searched for contraband by Britain and France.

The British government failed to take into account the strength of the American merchant marine and support from European countries, which allowed the colonies to import munitions and continue trading with relative impunity. While well aware of this, the North administration delayed placing the Royal Navy on a war footing for cost reasons; this prevented the institution of an effective blockade and restricted them to ineffectual diplomatic protests. Traditional British policy was to employ European land-based allies to divert the opposition, a role filled by Prussia in the Seven Years' War; in 1778, they were diplomatically isolated and faced war on multiple fronts.

Meanwhile, George III had given up on subduing America while Britain had a European war to fight. He did not welcome war with France, but he believed the British victories over France in the Seven Years' War as a reason to believe in ultimate victory over France. Britain could not find a powerful ally among the Great Powers to engage France on the European continent. Britain subsequently changed its focus into the Caribbean theater, and diverted major military resources away from America.

Vergennes's colleague stated, "For her honour, France had to seize this opportunity to rise from her degradation ... If she neglected it, if fear overcame duty, she would add debasement to humiliation, and become an object of contempt to her own century and to all future peoples".

Stalemate in the North

At the end of 1777, Howe resigned and was replaced by Sir Henry Clinton on May 24, 1778; with French entry into the war, he was ordered to consolidate his forces in New York. On June 18, the British departed Philadelphia with the reinvigorated Americans in pursuit; the Battle of Monmouth on June 28 was inconclusive but boosted Patriot morale. Washington had rallied Charles Lee's broken regiments, the Continentals repulsed British bayonet charges, the British rear guard lost perhaps 50 per-cent more casualties, and the Americans held the field at the end of the day. That midnight, the newly installed Clinton continued his retreat to New York.

A French naval force under Admiral Charles Henri Hector d'Estaing was sent to assist Washington; deciding New York was too formidable a target, in August they launched a combined attack on Newport, with General John Sullivan commanding land forces. The resulting Battle of Rhode Island was indecisive; badly damaged by a storm, the French withdrew to avoid putting their ships at risk. Further activity was limited to British raids on Chestnut Neck and Little Egg Harbor in October.

In July 1779, the Americans captured British positions at Stony Point and Paulus Hook. Clinton unsuccessfully tried to tempt Washington into a decisive engagement by sending General William Tryon to raid Connecticut. In July, a large American naval operation, the Penobscot Expedition, attempted to retake Maine, then part of Massachusetts, but was defeated. Persistent Iroquois raids along the border with Quebec led to the punitive Sullivan Expedition in April 1779, destroying many settlements but failing to stop them.

During the winter of 1779–1780, the Continental Army suffered greater hardships than at Valley Forge. Morale was poor, public support fell away in the long war, the Continental dollar was virtually worthless, the army was plagued with supply problems, desertion was common, and mutinies occurred in the Pennsylvania Line and New Jersey Line regiments over the conditions in early 1780.

In June 1780, Clinton sent 6,000 men under Wilhelm von Knyphausen to retake New Jersey, but they were halted by local militia at the Battle of Connecticut Farms; although the Americans withdrew, Knyphausen felt he was not strong enough to engage Washington's main force and retreated. A second attempt two weeks later ended in a British defeat at the Battle of Springfield, effectively ending their ambitions in New Jersey. In July, Washington appointed Benedict Arnold commander of West Point; his attempt to betray the fort to the British failed due to incompetent planning, and the plot was revealed when his British contact John André was captured and later executed. Arnold escaped to New York and switched sides, an action justified in a pamphlet addressed "To the Inhabitants of America"; the Patriots condemned his betrayal, while he found himself almost as unpopular with the British.

War in the South

The "Southern Strategy" was developed by Lord Germain, based on input from London-based Loyalists like Joseph Galloway. They argued it made no sense to fight the Patriots in the north where they were strongest, while the New England economy was reliant on trade with Britain, regardless of who governed it. On the other hand, duties on tobacco made the South far more profitable for Britain, while local support meant securing it required small numbers of regular troops. Victory would leave a truncated United States facing British possessions in the south, Canada to the north, and Ohio on their western border; with the Atlantic seaboard controlled by the Royal Navy, Congress would be forced to agree to terms. However, assumptions about the level of Loyalist support proved wildly optimistic.

Germain accordingly ordered Augustine Prévost, the British commander in East Florida, to advance into Georgia in December 1778. Lieutenant-Colonel Archibald Campbell, an experienced officer taken prisoner earlier in the war before being exchanged for Ethan Allen, captured Savannah on December 29, 1778. He recruited a Loyalist militia of nearly 1,100, many of whom allegedly joined only after Campbell threatened to confiscate their property. Poor motivation and training made them unreliable troops, as demonstrated in their defeat by Patriot militia at the Battle of Kettle Creek on February 14, 1779, although this was offset by British victory at Brier Creek on March 3.

In June 1779, Prévost launched an abortive assault on Charleston, before retreating to Savannah, an operation notorious for widespread looting by British troops that enraged both Loyalists and Patriots. In October, a joint French and American operation under Admiral d'Estaing and General Benjamin Lincoln failed to recapture Savannah. Prévost was replaced by Lord Cornwallis, who assumed responsibility for Germain's strategy; he soon realized estimates of Loyalist support were considerably over-stated, and he needed far larger numbers of regular forces.

Reinforced by Clinton, Cornwallis' troops captured Charleston in May 1780, inflicting the most serious Patriot defeat of the war; over 5,000 prisoners were taken and the Continental Army in the south effectively destroyed. On May 29, Lieutenant-Colonel Banastre Tarleton's mainly Loyalist force routed a Continental Army force nearly three times its size under the command of Colonel Abraham Buford at the Battle of Waxhaws. The battle is controversial for allegations of a massacre, which were later used as a recruiting tool by the Patriots.

Clinton returned to New York, leaving Cornwallis to oversee the south; despite their success, the two men left barely on speaking terms, with dire consequences for the future conduct of the war. The Southern strategy depended on local support, but this was undermined by a series of coercive measures. Previously, captured Patriots were sent home after swearing not to take up arms against the king; they were now required to fight their former comrades, while the confiscation of Patriot-owned plantations led formerly neutral "grandees" to side with them. Skirmishes at Williamson's Plantation, Cedar Springs, Rocky Mount, and Hanging Rock signaled widespread resistance to the new oaths throughout South Carolina.

In July 1780, Congress appointed General Horatio Gates commander in the south; he was defeated at the Battle of Camden on August 16, leaving Cornwallis free to enter North Carolina. Despite battlefield success, the British could not control the countryside and Patriot attacks continued; before moving north, Cornwallis sent Loyalist militia under Major Patrick Ferguson to cover his left flank, leaving their forces too far apart to provide mutual support. In early October, Ferguson was defeated at the Battle of Kings Mountain, dispersing organized Loyalist resistance in the region. Despite this, Cornwallis continued into North Carolina hoping for Loyalist support, while Washington replaced Gates with General Nathanael Greene in December 1780.

Greene divided his army, leading his main force southeast pursued by Cornwallis; a detachment was sent southwest under Daniel Morgan, who defeated Tarleton's British Legion at Cowpens on January 17, 1781, nearly eliminating it as a fighting force. The Patriots now held the initiative in the south, with the exception of a raid on Richmond led by Benedict Arnold in January 1781. Greene led Cornwallis on a series of countermarches around North Carolina; by early March, the British were exhausted and short of supplies and Greene felt strong enough to fight the Battle of Guilford Court House on March 15. Although victorious, Cornwallis suffered heavy casualties and retreated to Wilmington, North Carolina seeking supplies and reinforcements.

The Patriots now controlled most of the Carolinas and Georgia outside the coastal areas; after a minor reversal at the Battle of Hobkirk's Hill, they recaptured Fort Watson and Fort Motte on April 15. On June 6, Brigadier General Andrew Pickens captured Augusta, leaving the British in Georgia confined to Charleston and Savannah. The assumption Loyalists would do most of the fighting left the British short of troops and battlefield victories came at the cost of losses they could not replace. Despite halting Greene's advance at the Battle of Eutaw Springs on September 8, Cornwallis withdrew to Charleston with little to show for his campaign.

Western campaign

From the beginning of the war, Bernardo de Gálvez, the Governor of Spanish Louisiana, allowed the Americans to import supplies and munitions into New Orleans, then ship them to Pittsburgh. This provided an alternative transportation route for the Continental Army, bypassing the British blockade of the Atlantic Coast.

The trade was organized by Oliver Pollock, a successful merchant in Havana and New Orleans who was appointed US "commercial agent". It also helped support the American campaign in the west; in the 1778 Illinois campaign, militia under General George Rogers Clark.  

In February 1778, an expedition of militia to destroy British military supplies in settlements along the Cuyahoga River was halted by adverse weather. Later in the year, a second campaign was undertaken to seize the Illinois Country from the British. Virginia militia, Canadien settlers, and Indian allies commanded by Colonel George Rogers Clark captured Kaskaskia on July 4 then secured Vincennes, though Vincennes was recaptured by Quebec Governor Henry Hamilton. In early 1779, the Virginians counter-attacked in the siege of Fort Vincennes and took Hamilton prisoner. Clark secured western British Quebec as the American Northwest Territory in the Treaty of Paris concluding the war.

When Spain joined France's war against Britain in 1779, their treaty specifically excluded Spanish military action in North America. Later that year, however, Gálvez initiated offensive operations against British outposts. First, he cleared British garrisons in Baton Rouge, Louisiana, Fort Bute, and Natchez, Mississippi, and captured five forts. In doing so, Gálvez opened navigation on the Mississippi River north to the American settlement in Pittsburg.

On May 25, 1780, British Colonel Henry Bird invaded Kentucky as part of a wider operation to clear American resistance from Quebec to the Gulf coast. Their Pensacola advance on New Orleans was overcome by Spanish Governor Gálvez's offensive on Mobile. Simultaneous British attacks were repulsed on St. Louis by the Spanish Lieutenant Governor de Leyba, and on the Virginia county courthouse at Cahokia by Lieutenant Colonel Clark. The British initiative under Bird from Detroit was ended at the rumored approach of Clark. The scale of violence in the Licking River Valley, was extreme "even for frontier standards."  It led to men of English and German settlements to join Clark's militia when the British and their hired German soldiers withdrew to the Great Lakes. The Americans responded with a major offensive along the Mad River in August which met with some success in the Battle of Piqua but did not end Indian raids.

French soldier Augustin de La Balme led a Canadian militia in an attempt to capture Detroit, but they dispersed when Miami natives led by Little Turtle attacked the encamped settlers on November 5. The war in the west had become a stalemate with the British garrison sitting in Detroit and the Virginians expanding westward settlements north of the Ohio River in the face of British-allied Indian resistance.

In 1781, Galvez and Pollock campaigned east along the Gulf Coast to secure West Florida, including British-held Mobile and Pensacola. The Spanish operations impaired the British supply of armaments to British Indian allies, which effectively suspended a military alliance to attack settlers between the Mississippi River and the Appalachian Mountains.

1782 saw large scale retaliations between settlers and Native Americans of the region, including the Gnadenhutten massacre and the Crawford expedition.  The 1782 Battle of Blue Licks was one of the last major engagements of the American Revolutionary War.  News of the treaty between Great Britain and the United States arrived late that year.  By this time, about 7% of Kentucky settlers had been killed in battles against Native Americans, contrasting with 1% of the population killed in the 13 colonies.  Lingering resentments led to continued fighting in the west after the war officially ended.

British defeat

Clinton spent most of 1781 based in New York City; he failed to construct a coherent operational strategy, partly due to his difficult relationship with Admiral Marriot Arbuthnot. In Charleston, Cornwallis independently developed an aggressive plan for a campaign in Virginia, which he hoped would isolate Greene's army in the Carolinas and cause the collapse of Patriot resistance in the South. This was approved by Lord Germain in London, but neither of them informed Clinton.

Washington and Rochambeau now discussed their options; the former wanted to attack New York, the latter Virginia, where Cornwallis' forces were less well-established and thus easier to defeat. Washington eventually gave way and Lafayette took a combined Franco-American force into Virginia, but Clinton misinterpreted his movements as preparations for an attack on New York. Concerned by this threat, he instructed Cornwallis to establish a fortified sea base where the Royal Navy could evacuate his troops to help defend New York.

When Lafayette entered Virginia, Cornwallis complied with Clinton's orders and withdrew to Yorktown, where he constructed strong defenses and awaited evacuation. An agreement by the Spanish navy to defend the French West Indies allowed Admiral de Grasse to relocate to the Atlantic seaboard, a move Arbuthnot did not anticipate. This provided Lafayette naval support, while the failure of previous combined operations at Newport and Savannah meant their co-ordination was planned more carefully. Despite repeated urging from his subordinates, Cornwallis made no attempt to engage Lafayette before he could establish siege lines. Even worse, expecting to be withdrawn within a few days he abandoned the outer defenses, which were promptly occupied by the besiegers and hastened British defeat.

On August 31, a British fleet under Thomas Graves left New York for Yorktown. After landing troops and munitions for the besiegers on August 30, de Grasse had remained in Chesapeake Bay and intercepted him on September 5; although the Battle of the Chesapeake was indecisive in terms of losses, Graves was forced to retreat, leaving Cornwallis isolated. An attempted breakout over the York River at Gloucester Point failed due to bad weather. Under heavy bombardment with dwindling supplies, Cornwallis felt his situation was hopeless and on October 16 sent emissaries to Washington to negotiate surrender; after twelve hours of negotiations, these were finalized the next day. Responsibility for defeat was the subject of fierce public debate between Cornwallis, Clinton and Germain. Despite criticism from his junior officers, Cornwallis retained the confidence of his peers and later held a series of senior government positions; Clinton ultimately took most of the blame and spent the rest of his life in obscurity.

Subsequent to Yorktown, American forces were assigned to supervise the armistice between Washington and Clinton made to facilitate British departure following the January 1782 law of Parliament forbidding any further British offensive action in North America. British-American negotiations in Paris led to preliminaries signed November 1782 acknowledging US independence. The enacted Congressional war aim for British withdrawal from its North American claims to be ceded to the US was completed for the coastal cities in stages.

In the South, Generals Greene and Wayne loosely invested the withdrawing British at Savanna and Charleston. There they observed the British finally taking off their regulars from Charleston December 14, 1782. Loyalist provincial militias of whites and free blacks, as well as Loyalists with their slaves were transported in a relocation to Nova Scotia and the British Caribbean. Native American allies of the British and some freed blacks were left to escape through the American lines unaided.

Washington moved his army to New Windsor on the Hudson River about sixty miles north of New York City, and there the substance of the American army was furloughed home with officers at half pay until the Treaty of Paris formally ended the war on September 3, 1783. At that time, Congress decommissioned the regiments of Washington's Continental Army and began issuing land grants to veterans in the Northwest Territories for their war service. The last of the British occupation of New York City ended on November 25, 1783, with the departure of Clinton's replacement, General Sir Guy Carleton.

Strategy and commanders 

To win their insurrection, the Americans needed to outlast the British will to continue the fight. To restore the empire, the British had to defeat the Continental Army in the early months, and compel the Congress to dissolve itself. Historian Terry M. Mays identifies three separate types of warfare, the first being a colonial conflict in which objections to Imperial trade regulation were as significant as taxation policy. The second was a civil war with all thirteen states split between Patriots, Loyalists and those who preferred to remain neutral. Particularly in the south, many battles were fought between Patriots and Loyalists with no British involvement, leading to divisions that continued after independence was achieved.

The third element was a global war between France, Spain, the Dutch Republic and Britain, with America as one of a number of different theaters. After entering the war in 1778, France provided the Americans money, weapons, soldiers, and naval assistance, while French troops fought under US command in North America. While Spain did not formally join the war in America, they provided access to the Mississippi River and by capturing British possessions on the Gulf of Mexico denied bases to the Royal Navy, as well as retaking Menorca and besieging Gibraltar in Europe.

Although the Dutch Republic was no longer a major power, prior to 1774 they still dominated the European carrying trade, and Dutch merchants made large profits by shipping French-supplied munitions to the Patriots. This ended when Britain declared war in December 1780 and the conflict proved disastrous to their economy. The Dutch were also excluded from the First League of Armed Neutrality, formed by Russia, Sweden and Denmark in March 1780 to protect neutral shipping from being stopped and searched for contraband by Britain and France. While of limited effect, these interventions forced the British to divert men and resources away from North America.

American strategy 

Congress had multiple advantages if the rebellion turned into a protracted war. Their prosperous state populations depended on local production for food and supplies rather than on imports from their mother country that lay six to twelve weeks away by sail. They were spread across most of the North American Atlantic seaboard, stretching 1,000 miles. Most farms were remote from the seaports, and controlling four or five major ports did not give British armies control over the inland areas. Each state had established internal distribution systems.

Each former colony had a long-established system of local militia, combat-tested in support of British regulars thirteen years before to secure an expanded British Empire. Together they took away French claims in North America west to the Mississippi River in the French and Indian War. The state legislatures independently funded and controlled their local militias. In the American Revolution, they trained and provided Continental Line regiments to the regular army, each with their own state officer corps. Motivation was also a major asset: each colonial capital had its own newspapers and printers, and the Patriots had more popular support than the Loyalists. British hoped that the Loyalists would do much of the fighting, but they fought less than expected.

Continental Army
 

When the war began, Congress lacked a professional army or navy, and each colony only maintained local militias. Militiamen were lightly armed, had little training, and usually did not have uniforms. Their units served for only a few weeks or months at a time and lacked the training and discipline of more experienced soldiers. Local county militias were reluctant to travel far from home and they were unavailable for extended operations. To compensate for this, Congress established a regular force known as the Continental Army on June 14, 1775, the origin of the modern United States Army, and appointed Washington as commander-in-chief. However, it suffered significantly from the lack of an effective training program and from largely inexperienced officers and sergeants, offset by a few senior officers.

Each state legislature appointed officers for both county and state militias and their regimental Continental Line officers; although Washington was required to accept Congressional appointments, he was still permitted to choose and command his own generals, such as Nathanael Greene; his chief of artillery, Henry Knox; and Alexander Hamilton, the chief of staff. One of Washington's most successful recruits to general officer was Baron Friedrich Wilhelm von Steuben, a veteran of the Prussian general staff who wrote the Revolutionary War Drill Manual. The development of the Continental Army was always a work in progress and Washington used both his regulars and state militia throughout the war; when properly employed, the combination allowed them to overwhelm smaller British forces, as at Concord, Boston, Bennington, and Saratoga. Both sides used partisan warfare, but the state militias effectively suppressed Loyalist activity when British regulars were not in the area.

Washington designed the overall military strategy of the war in cooperation with Congress, established the principle of civilian supremacy in military affairs, personally recruited his senior officer corps, and kept the states focused on a common goal. For the first three years until after Valley Forge, the Continental Army was largely supplemented by local state militias. Initially, Washington employed the inexperienced officers and untrained troops in Fabian strategies rather than risk frontal assaults against Britain's professional soldiers and officers. Over the course of the entire war, Washington lost more battles than he won, but he never surrendered his troops and maintained a fighting force in the face of British field armies and never gave up fighting for the American cause.

By prevailing European standards, the armies in America were relatively small, limited by lack of supplies and logistics; the British in particular were constrained by the difficulty of transporting troops across the Atlantic and dependence on local supplies. Washington never directly commanded more than 17,000 men, while the combined Franco-American army at Yorktown was only about 19,000. At the beginning of 1776, Patriot forces consisted of 20,000 men, with two-thirds in the Continental Army and the other third in the various state militias. About 250,000 men served as regulars or as militia for the Revolutionary cause over eight years during wartime, but there were never more than 90,000 men under arms at one time.

As a whole, American officers never equaled their opponents in tactics and maneuvers, and they lost most of the pitched battles. The great successes at Boston (1776), Saratoga (1777), and Yorktown (1781) were won from trapping the British far from base with a greater number of troops. Nevertheless, after 1778, Washington's army was transformed into a more disciplined and effective force, mostly by Baron von Steuben's training. Immediately after the Army emerged from Valley Forge, it proved its ability to match the British troops in action at the Battle of Monmouth, including a black Rhode Island regiment fending off a British bayonet attack then counter-charging for the first time in Washington's army. Here Washington came to realize that saving entire towns was not necessary, but preserving his army and keeping the revolutionary spirit alive was more important in the long run. Washington informed Henry Laurens "that the possession of our towns, while we have an army in the field, will avail them little."

Although Congress was responsible for the war effort and provided supplies to the troops, Washington took it upon himself to pressure the Congress and state legislatures to provide the essentials of war; there was never nearly enough. Congress evolved in its committee oversight and established the Board of War, which included members of the military. Because the Board of War was also a committee ensnared with its own internal procedures, Congress also created the post of Secretary of War, and appointed Major General Benjamin Lincoln in February 1781 to the position. Washington worked closely with Lincoln to coordinate civilian and military authorities and took charge of training and supplying the army.

Continental Navy
 
During the first summer of the war, Washington began outfitting schooners and other small seagoing vessels to prey on ships supplying the British in Boston. Congress established the Continental Navy on October 13, 1775, and appointed Esek Hopkins as its first commander; for most of the war, it consisted of a handful of small frigates and sloops, supported by numerous privateers. On November 10, 1775, Congress authorized the creation of the Continental Marines, forefather of the United States Marine Corps.

John Paul Jones became the first American naval hero by capturing HMS Drake on April 24, 1778, the first victory for any American military vessel in British waters. The last was by the frigate USS Alliance commanded by Captain John Barry. On March 10, 1783, the Alliance outgunned HMS Sybil in a 45-minute duel while escorting Spanish gold from Havana to Congress. After Yorktown, all US Navy ships were sold or given away; it was the first time in America's history that it had no fighting forces on the high seas.

Congress primarily commissioned privateers to reduce costs and to take advantage of the large proportion of colonial sailors found in the British Empire. Overall, they included 1,700 ships that successfully captured 2,283 enemy ships to damage the British effort and to enrich themselves with the proceeds from the sale of cargo and the ship itself. About 55,000 sailors served aboard American privateers during the war.

France
 
At the beginning of the war, the Americans had no major international allies, as most nation-states watched and waited to see how developments would unfold in British North America. Over time, the Continental Army acquitted itself well in the face of British regulars and their hired German soldiers known to all European great powers. Battles such as the Battle of Bennington, the Battles of Saratoga, and even defeats such as the Battle of Germantown, proved decisive in gaining the attention and support of powerful European nations including France and Spain, and the Dutch Republic; the latter moved from covertly supplying the Americans with weapons and supplies to overtly supporting them.

The decisive American victory at Saratoga convinced France, who was already a long-time rival of Britain, to offer the Americans the Treaty of Amity and Commerce. The two nations also agreed to a defensive Treaty of Alliance to protect their trade and also guaranteed American independence from Britain. To engage the United States as a French ally militarily, the treaty was conditioned on Britain initiating a war on France to stop it from trading with the US. Spain and the Dutch Republic were invited to join by both France and the United States in the treaty, but neither made a formal reply.

On June 13, 1778, France declared war on Great Britain, and it invoked the French military alliance with the US, which ensured additional US privateer support for French possessions in the Caribbean. Washington worked closely with the soldiers and navy that France would send to America, primarily through Lafayette on his staff. French assistance made critical contributions required to defeat General Charles Cornwallis at Yorktown in 1781.

British strategy 

The British military had considerable experience of fighting in North America, most recently during the Seven Years' War which forced France to give up New France in 1763. However, in previous conflicts they benefited from local logistics, as well as support from the colonial militia, which was not available in the American Revolutionary War. Reinforcements had to come from Europe, and maintaining large armies over such distances was extremely complex; ships could take three months to cross the Atlantic, and orders from London were often outdated by the time they arrived.

Prior to the conflict, the colonies were largely autonomous economic and political entities, with no centralized area of ultimate strategic importance. This meant that, unlike Europe where the fall of a capital city often ended wars, that in America continued even after the loss of major settlements such as Philadelphia, the seat of Congress, New York and Charleston. British power was reliant on the Royal Navy, whose dominance allowed them to resupply their own expeditionary forces while preventing access to enemy ports. However, the majority of the American population was agrarian, rather than urban; supported by the French navy and blockade runners based in the Dutch Caribbean, their economy was able to survive.

The geographical size of the colonies and limited manpower meant the British could not simultaneously conduct military operations and occupy territory without local support. Debate persists over whether their defeat was inevitable; one British statesman described it as "like trying to conquer a map". While Ferling argues Patriot victory was nothing short of a miracle, Ellis suggests the odds always favored the Americans, especially after Howe squandered the chance of a decisive British success in 1776, an "opportunity that would never come again". The US military history speculates the additional commitment of 10,000 fresh troops in 1780 would have placed British victory "within the realm of possibility".

British Army

The expulsion of France from North America in 1763 led to a drastic reduction in British troop levels in the colonies; in 1775, there were only 8,500 regular soldiers among a civilian population of 2.8 million. The bulk of military resources in the Americas were focused on defending sugar islands in the Caribbean; Jamaica alone generated more revenue than all thirteen American colonies combined. With the end of the Seven Years' War, the permanent army in Britain was also cut back, which resulted in administrative difficulties when the war began a decade later.

Over the course of the war, there were four separate British commanders-in-chief, the first of whom was Thomas Gage; appointed in 1763, his initial focus was establishing British rule in former French areas of Canada. Rightly or wrongly, many in London blamed the revolt on his failure to take firm action earlier, and he was relieved after the heavy losses incurred at Bunker Hill. His replacement was Sir William Howe, a member of the Whig faction in Parliament who opposed the policy of coercion advocated by Lord North; Cornwallis, who later surrendered at Yorktown, was one of many senior officers who initially refused to serve in North America.

The 1775 campaign showed the British overestimated the capabilities of their own troops and underestimated the colonial militia, requiring a reassessment of tactics and strategy. However, it allowed the Patriots to take the initiative and British authorities rapidly lost control over every colony. Howe's responsibility is still debated; despite receiving large numbers of reinforcements, Bunker Hill seems to have permanently affected his self-confidence and lack of tactical flexibility meant he often failed to follow up opportunities. Many of his decisions were attributed to supply problems, such as the delay in launching the New York campaign and failure to pursue Washington's beaten army. Having lost the confidence of his subordinates, he was recalled after Burgoyne surrendered at Saratoga.

Following the failure of the Carlisle Commission, British policy changed from treating the Patriots as subjects who needed to be reconciled to enemies who had to be defeated. In 1778, Howe was replaced by Sir Henry Clinton, appointed instead of Carleton who was considered overly cautious. Regarded as an expert on tactics and strategy, like his predecessors Clinton was handicapped by chronic supply issues. As a result, he was largely inactive in 1779 and much of 1780; in October 1780, he warned Germain of "fatal consequences" if matters did not improve.

In addition, Clinton's strategy was compromised by conflict with political superiors in London and his colleagues in North America, especially Admiral Mariot Arbuthnot, replaced in early 1781 by Rodney. He was neither notified nor consulted when Germain approved Cornwallis' invasion of the south in 1781 and delayed sending him reinforcements believing the bulk of Washington's army was still outside New York City. After the surrender at Yorktown, Clinton was relieved by Carleton, whose major task was to oversee the evacuation of Loyalists and British troops from Savannah, Charleston, and New York City.

German troops

During the 18th century, states commonly hired foreign soldiers.  This especially included Britain; during the Seven Years' War, foreign soldiers comprised 10% of the British army and their use caused little debate. When it became clear additional troops were needed to suppress the revolt in America, it was decided to employ professional German soldiers. There were several reasons for this, including public sympathy for the Patriot cause, an historical reluctance to expand the British army and the time needed to recruit and train new regiments. An alternate source was readily available in the Holy Roman Empire, where many smaller states had a long tradition of renting their armies to the highest bidder. The most important was Hesse-Kassel, known as "the Mercenary State".

The first supply agreements were signed by the North administration in late 1775; over the next decade, more than 40,000 Germans fought in North America, Gibraltar, South Africa and India, of whom 30,000 served in the American War. Often generically referred to as "Hessians", they included men from many other states, including Hanover and Brunswick. Sir Henry Clinton recommended recruiting Russian troops whom he rated very highly, having seen them in action against the Ottomans; however, negotiations with Catherine the Great made little progress.

Unlike previous wars their use led to intense political debate in Britain, France, and even Germany, where Frederick the Great refused to provide passage through his territories for troops hired for the American war. In March 1776, the agreements were challenged in Parliament by Whigs who objected to "coercion" in general, and the use of foreign soldiers to subdue "British subjects". The debates were covered in detail by American newspapers, which reprinted key speeches and in May 1776 they received copies of the treaties themselves. Provided by British sympathizers, these were smuggled into North America from London by George Merchant, a recently released American prisoner.

The prospect of foreign German soldiers being used in the colonies bolstered support for independence, more so than taxation and other acts combined; the King was accused of declaring war on his own subjects, leading to the idea there were now two separate governments. By apparently showing Britain was determined to go to war, it made hopes of reconciliation seem naive and hopeless, while the employment of what was regarded as "foreign mercenaries" became one of the charges levelled against George III in the Declaration of Independence. The Hessian reputation within Germany for brutality also increased support for the Patriot cause among German-American immigrants.

The presence of over 150,000 German-Americans meant both sides felt the German soldiers might be persuaded to desert; one reason Clinton suggested employing Russians was that he felt they were less likely to defect. When the first German troops arrived on Staten Island in August 1776, Congress approved the printing of "handbills" promising land and citizenship to any willing to join the Patriot cause. The British launched a counter-campaign claiming deserters could well be executed for meddling in a war that was not theirs. Desertion among the Germans occurred throughout the war, with the highest rate of desertion occurring during the time between the surrender at Yorktown and the Treaty of Paris. German regiments were central to the British war effort; of the estimated 30,000 sent to America, some 13,000 became casualties.

Revolution as civil war

Loyalists
 

Wealthy Loyalists convinced the British government that most of the colonists were sympathetic toward the Crown; consequently, British military planners relied on recruiting Loyalists, but had trouble recruiting sufficient numbers as the Patriots had widespread support. Nevertheless, they continued to deceive themselves on their level of American support as late as 1780, a year before hostilities ended.

Approximately 25,000 Loyalists fought for the British throughout the war. Although Loyalists constituted about twenty percent of the colonial population, they were concentrated in distinct communities. Many of them lived among large plantation owners in the Tidewater region and South Carolina who produced cash crops in tobacco and indigo comparable to global markets in Caribbean sugar.

When the British began probing the backcountry in 1777–1778, they were faced with a major problem: any significant level of organized Loyalist activity required a continued presence of British regulars. The available manpower that the British had in America was insufficient to protect Loyalist territory and counter American offensives. The Loyalist militias in the South were constantly defeated by neighboring Patriot militia. The most critical combat between the two partisan militias was at the Battle of Kings Mountain; the Patriot victory irreversibly impaired any further Loyalist militia capability in the South.

When the early war policy was administered by General William Howe, the Crown's need to maintain Loyalist support prevented it from using the traditional revolt suppression methods. The British cause suffered when their troops ransacked local homes during an aborted attack on Charleston in 1779 that enraged both Patriots and Loyalists. After Congress rejected the Carlisle Peace Commission in 1778 and Westminster turned to "hard war" during Clinton's command, neutral colonists in the Carolinas often allied with the Patriots whenever brutal combat broke out between Tories and Whigs. Conversely, Loyalists gained support when Patriots intimidated suspected Tories by destroying property or tarring and feathering.

A Loyalist militia unit—the British Legion—provided some of the best troops in British service; it received a commission in the British Army. It was a mixed regiment of 250 dragoons and 200 infantry supported by batteries of flying artillery. It was commanded by Banastre Tarleton and gained a fearsome reputation in the colonies for "brutality and needless slaughter". In May 1779 the British Legion was one of five regiments that formed the American Establishment.

Women

Women played various roles during the Revolutionary War; they often accompanied their husbands when permitted to do so. For example, throughout the war Martha Washington was known to visit and provide aid to her husband George at various American camps, and Frederika Charlotte Riedesel documented the Saratoga campaign. Women often accompanied armies as camp followers to sell goods and perform necessary tasks in hospitals and camps. They were a necessary part of eighteenth-century armies, and numbered in the thousands during the war.

Women also assumed military roles: aside from military tasks like treating the wounded or setting up camp, some dressed as men to directly support combat, fight, or act as spies on both sides of the Revolutionary War. Anna Maria Lane joined her husband in the Army and wore men's clothes by the time the Battle of Germantown happened. The Virginia General Assembly later cited her bravery: she fought while dressed as a man and "performed extraordinary military services, and received a severe wound at the battle of Germantown ... with the courage of a soldier".

On April 26, 1777, Sybil Ludington is said to have ridden to alert militia forces of Putnam County, New York, and Danbury, Connecticut, to warn them of the British's approach; she has been called the "female Paul Revere". A report in The New England Quarterly says there is little evidence backing the story, and whether the ride occurred is questioned. A few others disguised themselves as men. Deborah Sampson fought until her gender was discovered and discharged as a result; Sally St. Clair was killed in action during the war.

African Americans

When war began, the population of the Thirteen Colonies included an estimated 500,000 slaves, predominantly used as labor on Southern plantations. In November 1775, Lord Dunmore, the Royal Governor of Virginia, issued a proclamation that promised freedom to any Patriot-owned slaves willing to bear arms. Although the announcement helped to fill a temporary manpower shortage, white Loyalist prejudice meant recruits were eventually redirected to non-combatant roles. The Loyalists' motive was to deprive Patriot planters of labor rather than to end slavery; Loyalist-owned slaves were returned.

The 1779 Philipsburg Proclamation issued by Clinton extended the offer of freedom to Patriot-owned slaves throughout the colonies. It persuaded entire families to escape to British lines, many of which were employed on farms to grow food for the army by removing the requirement for military service. While Clinton organized the Black Pioneers, he also ensured fugitive slaves were returned to Loyalist owners with orders that they were not to be punished for their attempted escape. As the war progressed, service as regular soldiers in British units became increasingly common; black Loyalists formed two regiments of the Charleston garrison in 1783.

Estimates of the numbers who served the British during the war vary from 25,000 to 50,000, excluding those who escaped during wartime. Thomas Jefferson estimated that Virginia may have lost 30,000 slaves in total escapes. In South Carolina, nearly 25,000 slaves (about 30 percent of the enslaved population) either fled, migrated, or died, which significantly disrupted the plantation economies both during and after the war.

Black Patriots were barred from the Continental Army until Washington convinced Congress in January 1778 that there was no other way to replace losses from disease and desertion. The 1st Rhode Island Regiment formed in February included former slaves whose owners were compensated; however, only 140 of its 225 soldiers were black and recruitment stopped in June 1788. Ultimately, around 5,000 African-Americans served in the Continental Army and Navy in a variety of roles, while another 4,000 were employed in Patriot militia units, aboard privateers, or as teamsters, servants, and spies. After the war, a small minority received land grants or Congressional pensions in old age; many others were returned to their masters post-war despite earlier promises of freedom.

As a Patriot victory became increasingly likely, the treatment of Black Loyalists became a point of contention; after the surrender of Yorktown in 1781, Washington insisted all escapees be returned but Cornwallis refused. In 1782 and 1783, around 8,000 to 10,000 freed blacks were evacuated by the British from Charleston, Savannah, and New York; some moved onto London, while 3,000 to 4,000 settled in Nova Scotia, where they founded settlements such as Birchtown. White Loyalists transported 15,000 enslaved blacks to Jamaica and the Bahamas. The free Black Loyalists who migrated to the British West Indies included regular soldiers from Dunmore's Ethiopian Regiment, and those from Charleston who helped garrison the Leeward Islands.

Native Americans

Most Native Americans east of the Mississippi River were affected by the war, and many tribes were divided over how to respond to the conflict. A few tribes were friendly with the colonists, but most Natives opposed the union of the Colonies as a potential threat to their territory. Approximately 13,000 Natives fought on the British side, with the largest group coming from the Iroquois tribes who deployed around 1,500 men.

Early in July 1776, Cherokee allies of Britain attacked the short-lived Washington District of North Carolina. Their defeat splintered both Cherokee settlements and people, and was directly responsible for the rise of the Chickamauga Cherokee, who perpetuated the Cherokee–American wars against American settlers for decades after hostilities with Britain ended.

Creek and Seminole allies of Britain fought against Americans in Georgia and South Carolina. In 1778, a force of 800 Creeks destroyed American settlements along the Broad River in Georgia. Creek warriors also joined Thomas Brown's raids into South Carolina and assisted Britain during the Siege of Savannah. Many Native Americans were involved in the fight between Britain and Spain on the Gulf Coast and along the British side of the Mississippi River. Thousands of Creeks, Chickasaws, and Choctaws fought in major battles such as the Battle of Fort Charlotte, the Battle of Mobile, and the Siege of Pensacola.

The Iroquois Confederacy was shattered as a result of the American Revolutionary War, whatever side they took; the Seneca, Onondaga, and Cayuga tribes sided with the British; members of the Mohawks fought on both sides; and many Tuscarora and Oneida sided with the Americans. To retaliate against raids on American settlement by Loyalists and their Indian allies, the Continental Army dispatched the Sullivan Expedition on a punitive expedition throughout New York to debilitate the Iroquois tribes that had sided with the British. Mohawk leaders Joseph Louis Cook and Joseph Brant sided with the Americans and the British respectively, which further exacerbated the split.

In the western theater of the American Revolutionary War, conflicts between settlers and Native Americans led to lingering distrust. In the 1783 Treaty of Paris, Great Britain ceded control of the disputed lands between the Great Lakes and the Ohio River, but the Indian inhabitants were not a part of the peace negotiations. Tribes in the Northwest Territory joined as the Western Confederacy and allied with the British to resist American settlement, and their conflict continued after the Revolutionary War as the Northwest Indian War.

Britain's "American war" and peace

Changing Prime Ministers
Lord North, Prime Minister since 1770, delegated control of the war in North America to Lord George Germain and the Earl of Sandwich, who was head of the Royal Navy from 1771 to 1782. Defeat at Saratoga in 1777 made it clear the revolt would not be easily suppressed, especially after the Franco-American alliance of February 1778, and French declaration of war in June. With Spain also expected to join the conflict, the Royal Navy needed to prioritize either the war in America or in Europe; Germain advocated the former, Sandwich the latter.

British negotiators now proposed a second peace settlement to Congress. The terms presented by the Carlisle Peace Commission included acceptance of the principle of self-government. Parliament would recognize Congress as the governing body, suspend any objectionable legislation, surrender its right to local colonial taxation, and discuss including American representatives in the House of Commons. In return, all property confiscated from Loyalists would be returned, British debts honored, and locally enforced martial law accepted. However, Congress demanded either immediate recognition of independence or the withdrawal of all British troops; they knew the commission were not authorized to accept these, bringing negotiations to a rapid end.

When the commissioners returned to London in November 1778, they recommended a change in policy. Sir Henry Clinton, the new British Commander-in-Chief in America, was ordered to stop treating the rebels as enemies, rather than subjects whose loyalty might be regained. Those standing orders would be in effect for three years until Clinton was relieved.

North initially backed the Southern strategy attempting to exploit divisions between the mercantile north and slave-owning south, but after the defeat of Yorktown, he was forced to accept the fact that this policy had failed. It was clear the war was lost, although the Royal Navy forced the French to relocate their fleet to the Caribbean in November 1781 and resumed a close blockade of American trade. The resulting economic damage and rising inflation meant the US was now eager to end the war, while France was unable to provide further loans; Congress could no longer pay its soldiers.

On February 27, 1782, a Whig motion to end the offensive war in America was carried by 19 votes. North now resigned, obliging the king to invite Lord Rockingham to form a government; a consistent supporter of the Patriot cause, he made a commitment to US independence a condition of doing so. George III reluctantly accepted and the new government took office on March 27, 1782; however, Rockingham died unexpectedly on July 1, and was replaced by Lord Shelburne who acknowledged American independence.

American Congress signs a peace

When Lord Rockingham, the Whig leader and friend of the American cause was elevated to Prime Minister, Congress consolidated its diplomatic consuls in Europe into a peace delegation at Paris. All were experienced in Congressional leadership. The dean of the delegation was Benjamin Franklin of Pennsylvania. He had become a celebrity in the French Court, but he was also an Enlightenment scientist with influence in the courts of European great powers in Prussia, England's former ally, and Austria, a Catholic empire like Spain. Since the 1760s he had been an organizer of British American inter-colony cooperation, and then a colonial lobbyist to Parliament in London. John Adams of Massachusetts had been consul to the Dutch Republic and was a prominent early New England Patriot. John Jay of New York had been consul to Spain and was a past president of the Continental Congress. As consul to the Dutch Republic, Henry Laurens of South Carolina had secured a preliminary agreement for a trade agreement. He had been a successor to John Jay as president of Congress and with Franklin was a member of the American Philosophical Society. Although active in the preliminaries, he was not a signer of the conclusive treaty.

The Whig negotiators for Lord Rockingham and his successor, Prime Minister Lord Shelburne, included long-time friend of Benjamin Franklin from his time in London, David Hartley and Richard Oswald, who had negotiated Laurens' release from the Tower of London. The Preliminary Peace signed on November 30 met four key Congressional demands: independence, territory up to the Mississippi, navigation rights into the Gulf of Mexico, and fishing rights in Newfoundland.

British strategy was to strengthen the US sufficiently to prevent France from regaining a foothold in North America, and they had little interest in these proposals. However, divisions between their opponents allowed them to negotiate separately with each to improve their overall position, starting with the American delegation in September 1782. The French and Spanish sought to improve their position by creating the U.S. dependent on them for support against Britain, thus reversing the losses of 1763. Both parties tried to negotiate a settlement with Britain excluding the Americans; France proposed setting the western boundary of the US along the Appalachians, matching the British 1763 Proclamation Line. The Spanish suggested additional concessions in the vital Mississippi River Basin, but required the cession of Georgia in violation of the Franco-American alliance.

Facing difficulties with Spain over claims involving the Mississippi River, and from France who was still reluctant to agree to American independence until all her demands were met, John Jay promptly told the British that he was willing to negotiate directly with them, cutting off France and Spain, and Prime Minister Lord Shelburne, in charge of the British negotiations, agreed. Key agreements for America in obtaining peace included recognition of United States independence, that she would gain all of the area east of the Mississippi River, north of Florida, and south of Canada; the granting of fishing rights in the Grand Banks, off the coast of Newfoundland and in the Gulf of Saint Lawrence; the United States and Great Britain were to each be given perpetual access to the Mississippi River.

An Anglo-American Preliminary Peace was formally entered into in November 1782, and Congress endorsed the settlement on April 15, 1783. It announced the achievement of peace with independence; the "conclusive" treaty was signed on September 2, 1783, in Paris, effective the next day September 3, when Britain signed its treaty with France. John Adams, who helped draft the treaty, claimed it represented "one of the most important political events that ever happened on the globe". Ratified respectively by Congress and Parliament, the final versions were exchanged in Paris the following spring. On 25 November, the last British troops remaining in the US were evacuated from New York to Halifax.

Aftermath 

Washington expressed astonishment that the Americans had won a war against a leading world power, referring to the American victory as "little short of a standing miracle". The conflict between British subjects with the Crown against those with the Congress had lasted over eight years from 1775 to 1783. The last uniformed British troops departed their last East Coast port cities in Savannah, Charleston, and New York City, by November 25, 1783. That marked the end of British occupation in the new United States.

On April 9, 1783, Washington issued orders that he had long waited to give, that "all acts of hostility" were to cease immediately. That same day, by arrangement with Washington, General Guy Carleton issued a similar order to British troops. British troops, however, were not to evacuate until a prisoner of war exchange occurred, an effort that involved much negotiation and would take some seven months to effect.

As directed by a Congressional resolution of May 26, 1783, all non-commissioned officers and enlisted were furloughed "to their homes" until the "definitive treaty of peace", when they would be automatically discharged. The US armies were directly disbanded in the field as of Washington's General Orders on Monday, June 2, 1783. Once the conclusive Treaty of Paris was signed with Britain, Washington resigned as commander-in-chief at Congress, leaving for his Army retirement at Mount Vernon.

Territory
The expanse of territory that was now the United States was ceded from its colonial mother country alone. It included millions of sparsely settled acres south of the Great Lakes Line between the Appalachian Mountains and the Mississippi River. The tentative colonial migration west became a flood during the years of the Revolutionary War. Virginia's Kentucky County counted 150 men in 1775. By 1790 fifteen years later, it numbered over 73,000 and was seeking statehood in the United States.

Britain's extended post-war policy for the US continued to try to establish an Indian buffer state below the Great Lakes as late as 1814 during the War of 1812. The formally acquired western American lands continued to be populated by a dozen or so American Indian tribes that had been British allies for the most part. Though British forts on their lands had been ceded to either the French or the British prior to the creation of the United States, Natives were not referred to in the British cession to the US.

While tribes were not consulted by the British for the treaty, in practice the British refused to abandon the forts on territory they formally transferred. Instead, they provisioned military allies for continuing frontier raids and sponsored the Northwest Indian War (1785–1795), including erecting an additional British Fort Miami (Ohio). British sponsorship of local warfare on the United States continued until the Anglo-American Jay Treaty went into effect. At the same time, the Spanish also sponsored war within the US by Indian proxies in its Southwest Territory ceded by France to Britain, then Britain to the Americans.

Of the European powers with American colonies adjacent to the newly created United States, Spain was most threatened by American independence, and it was correspondingly the most hostile to it. Its territory adjacent to the US was relatively undefended, so Spanish policy developed a combination of initiatives. Spanish soft power diplomatically challenged the British territorial cession west to the Mississippi and the previous northern boundaries of Spanish Florida. It imposed a high tariff on American goods, then blocked American settler access to the port of New Orleans. Spanish hard power extended war alliances and arms to Southwestern Natives to resist American settlement. A former Continental Army General, James Wilkinson settled in Kentucky County, Virginia in 1784, and there he fostered settler secession from Virginia during the Spanish-allied Chickamauga Cherokee war. Beginning in 1787, he received pay as Spanish Agent 13, and subsequently expanded his efforts to persuade American settlers west of the Appalachians to secede from the United States, first in the Washington administration, and later again in the Jefferson administration.

Casualties and losses

The total loss of life throughout the conflict is largely unknown. As was typical in wars of the era, diseases such as smallpox claimed more lives than battle. Between 1775 and 1782, a smallpox epidemic broke out throughout North America, killing an estimated 130,000 among all its populations during those years. Historian Joseph Ellis suggests that Washington's decision to have his troops inoculated against the disease was one of his most important decisions.

Up to 70,000 American Patriots died during active military service. Of these, approximately 6,800 were killed in battle, while at least 17,000 died from disease. The majority of the latter died while prisoners of war of the British, mostly in the prison ships in New York Harbor. The number of Patriots seriously wounded or disabled by the war has been estimated from 8,500 to 25,000.

The French suffered 2,112 killed in combat in the United States. The Spanish lost a total of 124 killed and 247 wounded in West Florida.

A British report in 1781 puts their total Army deaths at 6,046 in North America (1775–1779). Approximately 7,774 Germans died in British service in addition to 4,888 deserters; of the former, it is estimated 1,800 were killed in combat.

Legacy
The American Revolution established the United States with its numerous civil liberties and set an example to overthrow both monarchy and colonial governments. The United States has the world's oldest written constitution, and the constitutions of other free countries often bear a striking resemblance to the US Constitution, often word-for-word in places. It inspired the French, Haitian, Latin American Revolutions, and others into the modern era.

Although the Revolution eliminated many forms of inequality, it did little to change the status of women, despite the role they played in winning independence. Most significantly, it failed to end slavery which continued to be a serious social and political issue and caused divisions that would ultimately end in civil war. While many were uneasy over the contradiction of demanding liberty for some, yet denying it to others, the dependence of southern states on slave labor made abolition too great a challenge. Between 1774 and 1780, many of the states banned the importation of slaves, but the institution itself continued.

In 1782, Virginia passed a law permitting manumission and over the next eight years more than 10,000 slaves were given their freedom. With support from Benjamin Franklin, in 1790 the Quakers petitioned Congress to abolish slavery; the number of abolitionist movements greatly increased, and by 1804 all the northern states had outlawed it. However, even many like Adams who viewed slavery as a 'foul contagion' opposed the 1790 petition as a threat to the Union. In 1808, Jefferson passed legislation banning the importation of slaves, but allowed the domestic slave trade to continue, arguing the federal government had no right to regulate individual states.

Historiography
A large historiography concerns the reasons the Americans revolted and successfully broke away.  The "Patriots", an insulting term used by the British that was proudly adopted by the Americans, stressed the constitutional rights of Englishmen, especially "No taxation without representation." Contemporaries credited the American Enlightenment with laying the intellectual, moral and ethical foundations of the Revolution among the Founding Fathers. Founders referred to the liberalism in the philosophy of John Locke as powerful influences. Although  Two Treatises of Government has long been cited as a major influence on American thinkers, historians David Lundberg and Henry F. May demonstrate that Locke's Essay Concerning Human Understanding was far more widely read than were his political Treatises. Historians since the 1960s have emphasized that the Patriot constitutional argument was made possible by the emergence of a sense of American nationalism that united all 13 colonies. In turn, that nationalism was rooted in a Republican value system that demanded consent of the governed and opposed aristocratic control. In Britain itself, republicanism was a fringe view since it challenged the aristocratic control of the British political system. Political power was not controlled by an aristocracy or nobility in the 13 colonies, and instead, the colonial political system was based on the winners of free elections, which were open to the majority of white men. In the analysis of the coming of the Revolution, historians in recent decades have mostly used one of three approaches.
 The Atlantic history view places the American story in a broader context, including subsequent revolutions in France and Haiti. It tends to reintegrate the historiographies of the American Revolution and the British Empire.
 The "new social history" approach looks at community social structure to find cleavages that were magnified into colonial cleavages.
 The ideological approach that centers on republicanism in the United States. Republicanism dictated there would be no royalty, aristocracy or national church but allowed for continuation of the British common law, which American lawyers and jurists understood and approved and used in their everyday practice. Historians have examined how the rising American legal profession adopted British common law to incorporate republicanism by selective revision of legal customs and by introducing more choices for courts.

Commemorations of the Revolutionary War
After the first U.S. postage stamp was issued in 1849, the U.S. Post Office frequently issued commemorative stamps celebrating the various people and events of the Revolutionary War. However, it would be more than 140 years after the Revolution before any stamp commemorating that war itself was ever issued. The first such stamp was the 'Liberty Bell' issue of 1926.

See also

 1776 in the United States: events, births, deaths, and other years
 Timeline of the American Revolution

Topics of the Revolution
 Committee of safety (American Revolution)
 Diplomacy in the American Revolutionary War
 Financial costs of the American Revolutionary War
 Flags of the American Revolution
 Naval operations in the American Revolutionary War

Social history of the Revolution
 Black Patriot
 Christianity in the United States#American Revolution
 The Colored Patriots of the American Revolution
 History of Poles in the United States#American Revolution
 List of clergy in the American Revolution
 List of Patriots (American Revolution)
 Quakers in the American Revolution
 Scotch-Irish Americans#American Revolution

Others in the American Revolution
 Nova Scotia in the American Revolution
 Watauga Association

Lists of Revolutionary military
 List of American Revolutionary War battles
 List of British Forces in the American Revolutionary War
 List of Continental Forces in the American Revolutionary War
 List of infantry weapons in the American Revolution
 List of United States militia units in the American Revolutionary War

Thirteen Colony economy
 Economic history of the US: Colonial economy to 1780
 Shipbuilding in the American colonies
 Slavery in the United States

Legacy and related
 American Revolution Statuary
 Commemoration of the American Revolution
 Founders Online
 Independence Day (United States)
 The Last Men of the Revolution
 List of plays and films about the American Revolution
 Museum of the American Revolution
 Tomb of the Unknown Soldier of the American Revolution
 United States Bicentennial
 United States Semiquincentennial
 List of wars of independence

Bibliographies
 Bibliography of the American Revolutionary War
 Bibliography of Thomas Jefferson
 Bibliography of George Washington

Notes

Citations
Year dates enclosed in [brackets] denote year of original printing

Bibliography

 
 
 
 
 
 
 
 
 
 
 
 
 

 
 
 
 
 
 
 
 
 
 
 
 
 
 
 
 
 
 
 
 
 Britannica.com 
 
 
 
 
 
 
 

 
 
 
 
 
 
 
 
 
 
 
 
 
 
 
 
 
 
 
 
 

 
 
 
 
 
 
 Dictionary of American Biography 
 
 
 
 
 
 
 
 

 
 
 
 
 
 Encyclopædia Britannica 
 

 
 
 
 
 
 
 
 
 
 
 
 
 
 
 
 
 

 
 
 
 
 
 
 
 
 
 
 
 

 
 
 
 
 
 
 
 
 
 
 
 
 
 
 

 
 

 
 
 
 
 
 

 
 
 
 
 
 
 
 
 
 
 , p. 73
 
 

 
 
 
 
 
 
 
 
 
 
 
 
 

 – Highly regarded examination of British strategy and leadership. An introduction by John W. Shy with his biographical sketch of Mackesy.
 
 
 
 
 
 
 
 
 
 
 
 
 
 
 
 
 
 
 
 
 
 
 

 
 
 
 
 

 
 
 
 
 

 
 
 
 
 
 
 
 
 
 
 
 

 
 
 
 
 
 
 
 
 
 
 
 
 
 
 Robinson Library 
 
 
 
 

 
 
 
 
 
 
 
 
 
 
 
 
 
 
 
 
 
 
 
 
 
 
 
 
 

 
 
 
 
 
 
 
 

 
 
 
 

 

 
 
 
 
 
 
 
 
 
 
 
 
 
  (See also:British Warships in the Age of Sail)
 
 
 

 

Websites without authors
 
 Canada's Digital Collections Program 
 History.org 
 Maryland State House 
 The History Place 
 Totallyhistory.com 
 U.S. Merchant Marine 
 U.S. National Archives 
 Valley Forge National Historic Park 
 Yale Law School, Massachusetts Act

Further reading

A selection of works relating to the war not listed above;

 Allison, David, and Larrie D. Ferreiro, eds. The American Revolution: A World War (Smithsonian, 2018) excerpt
 Volumes committed to the American Revolution: Vol. 7; Vol. 8; Vol. 9; Vol. 10
 Bobrick, Benson. Angel in the Whirlwind: The Triumph of the American Revolution. Penguin, 1998 (paperback reprint)
 
 
 
 
 
 Chartrand, Rene. The French Army in the American War of Independence (1994). Short (48pp), very well illustrated descriptions.
 
 
 
 Commager, Henry Steele and Richard B. Morris, eds. The Spirit of 'Seventy-Six': The Story of the American Revolution as told by Participants. (Indianapolis: Bobbs-Merrill, 1958). online
 Conway, Stephen. The War of American Independence 1775–1783. Publisher: E. Arnold, 1995. . 280 pp.
 
 
 
 
 
 
 
 Foner, Eric, "Whose Revolution?: The history of the United States' founding from below" (review of Woody Holton, Liberty Is Sweet: The Hidden History of the American Revolution, Simon & Schuster, 2021, 800 pp.), The Nation, vol. 314, no. 8 (18–25 April 2022), pp. 32–37. Highlighted are the struggles and tragic fates of America's Indians and Black slaves. For example, "In 1779 [George] Washington dispatched a contingent of soldiers to upstate New York to burn Indian towns and crops and seize hostages 'of every age and sex.' The following year, while serving as governor of Virginia, [Thomas] Jefferson ordered troops under the command of George Rogers Clark to enter the Ohio Valley and bring about the expulsion or 'extermination' of local Indians." (pp. 34–35.)
 
 
 
 
 
 
 
 
 
 
 
 
 
 
 
 Kwasny, Mark V. Washington's Partisan War, 1775–1783. Kent, Ohio: 1996. . Militia warfare.
 
 
 
 Library of Congress 
 
 May, Robin. The British Army in North America 1775–1783 (1993). Short (48pp), very well illustrated descriptions.
 
 
 
 
 
 National Institute of Health 
 Neimeyer, Charles Patrick. America Goes to War: A Social History of the Continental Army (1995) 
 
 
 
 
 
 
 
 Royal Navy Museum 
 
 
 
 
 
 
 Stoker, Donald, Kenneth J. Hagan, and Michael T. McMaster, eds. Strategy in the American War of Independence: a global approach (Routledge, 2009) excerpt.
 Symonds, Craig L. A Battlefield Atlas of the American Revolution (1989), newly drawn maps emphasizing the movement of military units
 
 
 
 
 U.S. Army, "The Winning of Independence, 1777–1783" American Military History Volume I, 2005.
 U.S. National Park Service 
 
 
 
 
 
 Zlatich, Marko; Copeland, Peter. General Washington's Army (1): 1775–78 (1994). Short (48pp), very well illustrated descriptions.
 ——. General Washington's Army (2): 1779–83 (1994). Short (48pp), very well illustrated descriptions.

Primary sources
In addition to this selection, many primary sources are available at the Princeton University Law School Avalon Project and at the Library of Congress Digital Collections (previously LOC webpage, American Memory). Original editions for titles related to the American Revolutionary War can be found open-sourced online at Internet Archive and Hathi Trust Digital Library.
 
 Emmerich, Adreas. The Partisan in War, a treatise on light infantry tactics written by Colonel Andreas Emmerich in 1789.

External links 

 Maps of the Revolutionary War from the United States Military Academy

Bibliographies online
 Library of Congress Guide to the American Revolution
 Bibliographies of the War of American Independence compiled by the United States Army Center of Military History
 Political bibliography from Omohundro Institute of Early American History and Culture

 
Conflicts in 1775
Conflicts in 1776
Conflicts in 1777
Conflicts in 1778
Conflicts in 1779
Conflicts in 1780
Conflicts in 1781
Conflicts in 1782
Conflicts in 1783
Global conflicts
Rebellions against the British Empire
Wars between the United Kingdom and the United States
Wars of independence